Capulus elegans is a species of small sea snails in the genus Capulus.

References

External links 
 Capulus elegans at WoRMS (accessed 1 September 2015)
 Capulus elegans at WMSD (Worldwide Mollusc Species Data Base) (accessed 1 September 2015)
 Capulus elegans at gbif.org (accessed 1 September 2015)

Capulidae
Gastropods described in 1877